Invisible Hands is an EP released by The Handsome Family. It was released 1997 as a limited Germany only, vinyl only release by Scout Releases. Only 1000 copies were pressed. The release contains an A4 lyrics sheet which states that "The House Carpenter" is a traditional, arranged by Brett Sparks. However "The House Carpenter" didn't make the record.

Track listing
All music, Brett Sparks; all lyrics, Rennie Sparks, except "Barbara Allen" (traditional, arranged by Brett Sparks)
 Side A
"Tin Foil"
from previous album Milk and Scissors
"Grandmother Waits For You"
early version of the track, a new version was recorded for In the Air
"Bury Me Here"
early version of the track, a new version was recorded for Through the Trees
Side B
"Birds You Cannot See"
early version of the track, a new version was recorded for Twilight
"Barbara Allen"
this track is exclusive to Invisible Hands and wasn't released again
"Cathedrals"
early version of the track, a new version was recorded for Through the Trees

See also

The Handsome Family

References

External links
The Handsome Family official website

1997 EPs
Scout Releases albums
The Handsome Family albums